The Girl with the Dragon Tattoo is the score album for David Fincher's 2011 film of the same name, composed by Trent Reznor and Atticus Ross. It was released on December 9, 2011, through The Null Corporation in the US and Mute Records outside North America. This is the second soundtrack that Reznor and Ross have worked on together, following the Oscar-winning The Social Network, also for Fincher.

The soundtrack is nearly three hours long, and includes covers of the Led Zeppelin track, "Immigrant Song", featuring Karen O of Yeah Yeah Yeahs, and the Bryan Ferry song, "Is Your Love Strong Enough?", by Reznor and Ross' own band, How to Destroy Angels. The former premiered on KROQ radio on December 2, 2011, and was made available as a download to anyone who purchased the iTunes pre-order of the album. In addition, the file was accompanied with an extended, 8 minute trailer for the film, scored specifically by Reznor and Ross. On December 2, a six-song sampler of the album was made available for free online along with the pre-release of various different formats of the soundtrack.

The score was nominated for the 2011 Golden Globe award for Best Original Score – Motion Picture, and won the 2012  Grammy award for Best Score Soundtrack For Visual Media. The album debuted on the  UK Albums Chart on 7 January 2012 at position 199.

Promotion
A teaser trailer for the film was released online on June 2, 2011, (previously being attached to certain domestic and international films), featuring a cover of Led Zeppelin's "Immigrant Song", by Reznor, Ross and Karen O (from the Yeah Yeah Yeahs).

On August 10, the film's official website was updated to feature background music "She Reminds Me of You", under the filename "Dotcom.mp3". As was the case with "Hand Covers Bruise" from The Social Network's official site, this backing music was the first piece from the score to be available for listening.

A full-length trailer for the film was released on September 22, featuring music from the score again, the first time the score had been specifically set to footage. Specifically the track "An Itch."

One track from the score ("What If We Could?") has been performed live by Reznor's band Nine Inch Nails on their Twenty Thirteen Tour in summer 2013.

Mouth Taped Shut
A Tumblr blog entitled Mouth Taped Shut was launched on August 20, 2011, releasing behind-the-scenes photographs of the shooting and production of the film. On October 3, the blog posted a YouTube video of custom posters for the film being printed, with backing music by Reznor and Ross. The blog was also used extensively to promote a public preview of the film, and had hosted snapshots of the score in progress.

...Comes Forth in the Thaw
An image posted on Mouth Taped Shut showed Reznor in the studio, working on the score. On close inspection, however, the monitor of his computer displayed the url, http://www.comesforthinthethaw.com, which when typed in linked to a site featuring an ever-evolving array of further background music accompanied to various film stills.

What Is Hidden in Snow...
Following a hidden clue on ...Comes Forth in theThaw, the website http://www.whatishiddeninsnow.com was found, which led to a series of treasure trails around the world, finding pieces from the film as part of an Alternate Reality Game promotion.

Packaging
The album's art was created by Nine Inch Nails and How to Destroy Angels' creative director Rob Sheridan and Neil Kellerhouse.

Release
The Girl with the Dragon Tattoo was opened for pre-orders online on December 2, 2011, on Reznor's independent label website Null Corporation in a number of different formats at various price points.  The digital copy was released on December 9, whilst retail copies of the album were distributed by Mute Records on December 27 in CD format followed by  the "Deluxe" edition on February 6. The smallest Dragon Tattoo package contains the entire album in 320 kbit/s MP3 format made available for download directly from the website for US$12. A lossless digital version includes a choice of Apple Lossless or FLAC for US$14. A standard physical version is available for US$14 and includes three audio CDs stored in an eight panel digipak with custom "ice" slipcase and a six panel insert, alongside a digital version delivered in 320 kbit/s MP3. A $300 "Deluxe Edition" includes a 6-LP 180 gram vinyl set in a deluxe book package with metal cover in a hard plastic "ice" slip cover, an exclusive custom 8GB metal razor blade USB pendant (inspired by Lisbeth Salander's razor blade necklace) containing the full album in high-fidelity 96k audio, a fold-out poster designed by Neil Kellerhouse, and a HD digital copy in either Apple Lossless, FLAC, or 320 kbit/s MP3 formats.

On the day of the six-track sampler's launch, Reznor posted about the release on the Nine Inch Nails website:

Reception

Critical reception

Critical response to the score was generally favorable, with an average rating of 76% based on 11 professional reviews on Metacritic. Christian Cottingham of Drowned in Sound noticed that, "like the film the soundtrack favours atmosphere over cheap thrill, taking its time to mount a sense of rising dread, layers of drone building overtop machinery echo and worn piano faded between scattered melodies and sparse percussion. In isolation it’s an accompaniment to 3am melancholy or the onset of madness: in context it’s Fincher’s bleached out whites and blacks and murky greens turned to sound, bleaker than their previous work and more ambitious even than NIN’s Ghosts." Cottingham asserted that Dragon Tattoo, "most(ly) recalls Reznor’s soundtrack for Quake in the late 1990s, where space and silence played a role as great as any multitrack in conveying tension and unsettling the mood. At times tender but mostly pretty terrifying, this needs to be heard somewhere loud, and preferably with an exit in easy reach."

Conversely professional film music critics like Christian Clemmensen, of Filmtracks, and Jonathan Broxton, of Movie Music UK, dismissed it entirely, the latter considering the score as: "little more than a series of ambient drones, overlaid with various industrial sound effects and staccato rhythms – de-tuned piano chords, plucked bass notes, and the like." He also stated: "When the score isn't jarringly distracting, it's virtually inaudible or indistinguishable from the film’s sound effects, begging the question of why the music is there in the first place."

Accolades

Track listing

Six Track Sampler

Award FYC album

An alternate album For Your Consideration (FYC) was sent by Sony Pictures to awarding bodies. It features the actual film cues, which have alternate titles, edits and mixes from the versions on the commercially available soundtrack, along with one composition not on the soundtrack release at all.

The same album was made available on the Sony Pictures FYC site as of February 6, 2012. Here, it was presented in chronological order from the film, and did not feature the Led Zeppelin cover performed by Trent Reznor and Karen O:

Personnel
Credits for The Girl with the Dragon Tattoo adapted from liner notes:

 Trent Reznor and Atticus Ross – composition, arrangements, performance, programming, and production
 Karen O – vocals (1)
 Mariqueen Maandig – vocals (11, 23, 30, 35, 39)
 How to Destroy Angels – performance (39)
 Blumpy – engineer
 Alan Moulder – mixing (1, 3, 5, 6, 8, 11, 13, 14, 16, 17, 18, 21, 23, 24, 25, 26, 29, 30, 33, 35, 38, 39)
 Michael Patterson – mixing (2, 4, 7, 9, 10, 12, 15, 19, 20, 22, 27, 28, 31, 32, 36, 37)
 Rob Sheridan – art direction
 Neil Kellerhouse – artwork and GDT typeface
 Jean-Baptiste Mondino – photography
 Tom Baker (at Precision Mastering, Hollywood, CA) – mastering

 David Fincher – executive producer
 Scott Rudin – executive producer
 Lia Vollack (for Columbia Pictures) – executive in charge of music
 Paul Kremen – consultant
 Rebel Waltz, Inc. – Trent Reznor and Null management
 Ren Klyce, Ceán Chaffin, Claudia Sarne, Susan Bonds, Alex Lieu, 42 Entertainment, Daniel Miller, Tim Ahlering, Raul Perez, Shelly Bunge, Andrea McKee, Brett Bachemein, Angela Sidlow, Larry Kohorn, Tara-Beaudine-Moore, Valerie Caton, Neil Ross, Fred de Jong, Michelle Jubelirer, Don Kennedy, Arif Mahmud, Gary Stiffleman, David Byrnes, Irina Volodarsky, Doug Mark, Paul Friedman, Tony Ciulla and Laura Haber – special thanks

Charts

Album

Singles

In popular media
 Parts of the tracks "Pinned and Mounted", "Hidden in Snow", and "What If We Could?" were used in the pilot episode of the TV series Elementary.

References

External links

 Official website for the soundtrack
 Official website for the film
 Mouth Taped Shut - Semi-official film production blog
 Comes Forth in the Thaw - Promotional website (film stills and soundtrack)
 What Is Hidden in Snow - Promotional website (ARG)

2011 soundtrack albums
Ambient soundtracks
Industrial soundtracks
Experimental music soundtracks
Albums produced by Atticus Ross
Albums produced by Trent Reznor
Trent Reznor soundtracks
Atticus Ross soundtracks
The Null Corporation soundtracks
Madison Gate Records soundtracks